Somatic may refer to:

 Somatic (biology), referring to the cells of the body in contrast to the germ line cells
 Somatic cell, a non-gametic cell in a multicellular organism
 Somatic nervous system, the portion of the vertebrate nervous system which regulates voluntary movements of the body
 Somatics, a group of alternative medicine approaches, experiential movement disciplines, and dance techniques
 Somatic theory, a model of human social behavior

Related concepts 
 Somatic marker hypothesis, an explanation of how emotions affect decision-making
 Somatic symptom disorder, aka somatoform disorder, characterized by medically unexplained physical symptoms, and considered to be a mental health issue
 Somatotype, the now-discredited idea associating body types with human temperament types
 Psychosomatic medicine, an interdisciplinary medical field exploring the relationships among social, psychological, and behavioral factors on bodily processes and quality of life in humans and animals

Other 
 Hahn Rowe, a musician who has performed as the act, Somatic, releasing an album with a related title (the new body)

See also 
 
 Touch (disambiguation)
 Tactile (disambiguation)
 Haptic (disambiguation)